Lorely is a collection of travel essays and a drama by Gérard de Nerval. The essays describe de Nerval's journeys along the Rhine and in the Netherlands and Belgium. It takes its title from the Lorelei, a rock on the eastern bank of the river Rhine.

The centerpiece of the book is the play Leo Buckhart, which de Nerval wrote in collaboration with Alexandre Dumas. 

The book is dedicated to Jules Janin and its introduction is addressed to him.

It was first published by Giraud and Dagneau, Maison du Coq d'or, in 1852.

Contents
  Sensations d’un Voyageur Enthusiaste (A travel enthusiast's feelings)
 Du Rhin au Main (From the Rhine to the Main)
 Souvenirs de Thuringe (Memories of Thuringia)
  Scènes de la Vie Allemande (the play Leo Burckhart).
  Rhin et Flandres (the Rhineland and Flanders)
  Les Fêtes de Hollande (Holland festivals)

French travel books
Works by Gérard de Nerval